The Garden Club of America Entrance Markers in Washington, D.C. is a Multiple Property Submission, or MPS, on the National Register of Historic Places. The seven structures that make up the MPS are ceremonial markers at important entrance points to the District of Columbia from the state of Maryland. Sets of two markers are located in Westmoreland Circle, Friendship Heights and Chevy Chase Circle. A single marker is located along Georgia Avenue.

History and features of the markers
The Garden Club erected the markers in 1932-1933 as a part of the George Washington bicentennial celebration. Other events that commemorated the observance included the formal openings of the Arlington Memorial Bridge and the George Washington Memorial Parkway.

The club also placed pairs of pylons at other entrances into the city, including sets at the Virginia ends of the Key Bridge and the Highway Bridge. Fences consisting of chains supported by four bollards originally surrounded each of the markers, as did planting schemes that the Maryland and Virginia chapters of the Garden Club designed. As the Club intended that the markers would notify people that they were passing a boundary, the Club did not install all on the city's actual boundaries.

Each of the seven existing markers show the effects of weathering, pollution and other abuse.  Motorists have knocked over some or all of these.  Some have been removed from their original locations and reinstalled nearby. The disposition of those that are no longer in place is now unknown.

The Garden Club installed a pair of markers at the city's north portal at 16th Street NW near Silver Spring, Maryland, but these are no longer in place. However, an entrance marker that does not resemble any that the Garden Club erected now stands at the north portal inside Blair Circle at the junction of Eastern Avenue, 16th Street NW, N. Portal Drive and Colesville Road.

Architect Edward Donn designed the Garden Club's markers. Donn based the markers' design on the markers of the Mason–Dixon line that had been installed in 1761 on the Pennsylvania and Maryland boundary. The markers are composed of Aquia Creek sandstone and bear the Seal of Maryland on one side and the Cartouche of the District of Columbia on the opposite side. The cartouche depicts George Washington with Lady Justice, a laurel wreath, the rising sun, and the capitol dome.

Locations of the markers

The locations of the markers are:

 Westmoreland Circle (two markers): Junction of Western Avenue and Massachusetts Avenue, NW. The markers are located opposite one another along the Western Avenue axis of the Circle, approximately two feet within the outside circumference of the circle. The westernmost marker stands beneath an oak tree and is surrounded by its original chain link fence. The easternmost marker stands in the open, without a protecting fence. The markers are between the Northwest No. 5 and Northwest No. 6 boundary markers of the original District of Columbia.
 Friendship Heights (two markers): Junction of Western Avenue and Wisconsin Avenue, near the Friendship Heights Metro Station. The markers are located on the east and west sides of Wisconsin Avenue, immediately north of Western Avenue. These markers are between the Northwest No. 6 and Northwest No. 7 boundary markers of the original District of Columbia.
 Chevy Chase Circle (two markers): Junction of Western Avenue and Connecticut Avenue. The markers are located well within the inside circumference of the circle, close to the Circle's east—west axis. Their sites are within the east and west sides of a grassy circle that lies between rings of azalea plantings and benches that form a perimeter around the centrally-placed Newlands Fountain. The plantings, grass and benches encircle a ring of stone paving that surrounds the fountain. These markers are between the Northwest No. 7 and Northwest No. 8 boundary markers of the original District of Columbia.
 Traffic island at the junction of Georgia Avenue, Alaska Avenue and Kalmia Road NW (one marker). The marker is located inside the triangular island's southeast corner, near the intersection of Georgia Avenue to the east and Kalmia Road to the south. A chain-link fence that bollards support surrounds the marker. A landscaped planting of shrubs is behind the marker.

 The marker was formerly located inside a median in the center of Georgia Avenue, just north of the Avenue's intersection with Kalmia Road and Alaska Avenue. The marker is between the former site of the Northeast No. 1 and the present site of the Northeast No. 2 boundary markers of the original District of Columbia.

List of the markers

The seven Garden Club of America Entrance Markers are tabulated in sequence below, beginning at Westmoreland Circle and proceeding clockwise. The tables also contain the date that each stone was listed on the National Register of Historic Places.

See also
Boundary Markers of the Original District of Columbia

References

External links

History of Washington, D.C.
Buildings and structures on the National Register of Historic Places in Washington, D.C.
1933 establishments in Washington, D.C.
Buildings and structures completed in 1933